The equivalent width of a spectral line is a measure of the area of the line on a plot of intensity versus wavelength in relation to underlying continuum level. It is found by forming a rectangle with a height equal to that of continuum emission, and finding the width such that the area of the rectangle is equal to the area in the spectral line. It is a measure of the strength of spectral features that is primarily used in astronomy.

Definition
Formally, the equivalent width is given by the equation

Here,  represents the underlying continuum intensity, while  represents the intensity of the actual spectrum (the line and continuum). Then  represents the width of a hypothetical line which drops to an intensity of zero and has the "same integrated flux deficit from the continuum as the true one."

Therefore, for a fixed line strength, the equivalent width will be smaller  for a brighter continuum.

This analogy can help in a better physical interpretation: imagine the plot showing your monetary savings (or flux in a spectrum; on the vertical axis), as a function of time (or wavelength in a spectrum, on the horizontal axis). When you don't have any spending (continuum), your saving rate as a function of time is relatively flat and may even have a slope (if your saving rate is increasing or decreasing). In this plot, making a purchase of something expensive is like an absorption line (it will momentarily bring down your saving rate). The "equivalent time" of that purchase is the "time" it takes for your continuum savings to replace that purchase in your bank account. In this analogy, the same purchase will have a lower "equivalent time" for someone who can save more than you (that person's "continuum" level is higher, so the "equivalent time" for replacing its value in their bank account is less). Similarly, we judge the strength of the emission/absorption line, in relation to the continuum level surrounding it, through the Equivalent Width.

Applications
The equivalent width is used as a quantitative measure of the strength of spectral features. The equivalent width is a convenient choice because the shapes of spectral features can vary depending upon the configuration of the system which is producing the lines. For instance, the line may experience Doppler broadening due to motions of the gas emitting the photons. The photons will be shifted away from the line center, thus rendering the height of the emission line a poor measure of its overall strength. The equivalent width, on the other hand, "measures the fraction of energy removed from the spectrum by the line," regardless of the broadening intrinsic to the line or a detector with poor resolution. Thus the equivalent width can in many conditions yield the number of absorbing or emitting atoms, by using the curve of growth.

For example, measurements of the equivalent width of the Balmer alpha transition in T Tauri stars are used in order to classify individual T Tauri stars as being classical or weak-lined. Also, the equivalent width is used in studying star formation in Lyman alpha galaxies, as the equivalent width of the Lyman alpha line is related to the star formation rate in the galaxy. The equivalent width is also used in many other situations where a quantitative comparison between line strengths is needed.

References

External links
Equivalent Width in the SAO Encyclopedia of Astronomy

Emission spectroscopy
Astrochemistry